Rowley Creek is a stream in Sauk and Columbia counties, in the U.S. state of Wisconsin. It is a tributary to the Baraboo River.

Rowley Creek was named for an early settler.

See also
List of rivers of Wisconsin

References

Rivers of Columbia County, Wisconsin
Rivers of Sauk County, Wisconsin
Rivers of Wisconsin